Nakhshiri Saint Ilya Church is a church in the village of Nakhshiri, Sokhumi municipality, Autonomous Republic of Abkhazi, Georgia.
In the same village there are also ruins of Middle Ages Saint Panagia Church.

History 
The church was built in the 20th century.

References 

Religious buildings and structures in Georgia (country)
Religious buildings and structures in Abkhazia
Churches in Abkhazia